Dum Dum is the sixth studio album by the Yugoslav band Ekatarina Velika, released in 1991. Srdjan "Žika" Todorović was here replaced by Marko Milivojević (ex Morbidi, U Škripcu), who remained the band's drummer till the end. It is the only EKV album written entirely by Milan Mladenović.

The album reflects the political climate in Yugoslavia at the beginning of the 1990s, and it is generally considered to be the darkest record EKV has made. The album was produced by Theodore Yanni and Đorđe Petrović. The guest stars were Mitar "Suba" Subotić, and Tanja Jovićević (backing vocals).

Track listing

Personnel 

Milan Mladenović - vocals, guitar
Margita Stefanović - piano, keyboards
Bata Božanić - bass
Dušan Petrović - bass
Marko Milivojević - drums

External links

Ekatarina Velika albums
1991 albums
PGP-RTB albums